William Francis Finn (1784 - 8 December 1862) was an Irish politician in the United Kingdom House of Commons.

He was elected to the United Kingdom House of Commons as Member of Parliament for County Kilkenny in 1832, and held the seat until 1837. His uncle was the owner and printer of Finn's Leinster Journal, Edmund Finn. Finn married Alicia O'Connell, the fifth sister of Daniel O'Connell. They lived at Tullaroan, County Kilkenny. Both he and his wife died on the same day, 8 December 1862.

References

    
    
    

1784 births
1862 deaths
Members of the Parliament of the United Kingdom for County Kilkenny constituencies (1801–1922)
UK MPs 1832–1835
UK MPs 1835–1837
Irish Repeal Association MPs